Mount Mankinen is a mountain,  high, situated  northeast of Mount Adamson in the Deep Freeze Range of Victoria Land, Antarctica. It was mapped by the United States Geological Survey from surveys and U.S. Navy air photos, 1960–64, and was named by the Advisory Committee on Antarctic Names for Edward A. Mankinen, a geologist at McMurdo Station, 1965–66.

References

Mountains of Victoria Land
Scott Coast